Archie vs. Predator II is a comic book and intercompany crossover, written by Alex de Campi and drawn by Robert Hack. It is a sequel to the 2015 comic Archie vs. Predator published as a five-issue limited series in the United States by Dark Horse Comics and Archie Comics. The first issue was released July 24, 2019.

Synopsis
In a valiant attempt to undo the grievous loss of their cherished friends, Betty and Veronica ally themselves with an unlikely companion, the polymorphed Predator, and embark on a perilous journey down Memory Lane. However, upon arriving at their destination, they are confronted with an unexpected scene - Memory Lane has been converted into a bustling construction site, and their prospects for reversing the past seem to be rapidly dwindling. Undeterred by this setback, the intrepid trio chooses to persevere, propelled by their steadfast determination to rectify the situation.

As they venture further into uncharted territory, they find themselves abruptly transported to an alternate universe, where their dear friends are still alive and preparing for a festive Halloween celebration. In this strange new realm, they encounter an unlikely comrade, Dilton, who is attired in a Predator costume and discloses that he has developed a revolutionary device capable of accessing parallel dimensions. However, before Dilton can activate the device in his helmet and embark on a journey to other worlds, an army of Predators intercepts the signal and traces it back to Earth.

References

2019 comics debuts 
2020 comics endings
Archie Comics titles
Dark Horse Comics titles
Intercompany crossovers
Predator (franchise) comics